The Palmetto Trail is a planned  foot and mountain bike trail in South Carolina for recreational hiking and biking. Several of the sections are also equestrian trails. It will extend from the Oconee County mountains to the Intracoastal Waterway in Charleston County. It currently consists of 26 segments totaling . Maps and trail guides are available.

The trail is sponsored by the Palmetto Conservation Foundation in cooperation with the South Carolina Department of Parks, Recreation, and Tourism. The trail has support from the South Carolina General Assembly. Actual trail construction has been aided by volunteer groups, land managers, Santee Cooper, the South Carolina National Guard, and many others.

Mini-trail guide

Maps 
 http://palmettoconservation.org/palmetto-trail/map/

References 

Hiking trails in South Carolina
Protected areas of Oconee County, South Carolina
Protected areas of Pickens County, South Carolina
Protected areas of Greenville County, South Carolina
Protected areas of Spartanburg County, South Carolina
Protected areas of Union County, South Carolina
Protected areas of Newberry County, South Carolina
Protected areas of Richland County, South Carolina
Protected areas of Sumter County, South Carolina
Protected areas of Clarendon County, South Carolina
Protected areas of Orangeburg County, South Carolina
Protected areas of Berkeley County, South Carolina
Protected areas of Charleston County, South Carolina
High Hills of Santee
Mountain biking venues in the United States
Long-distance trails in the United States